The 2011–2012 season was Sarajevo's 63rd season in existence, and their 18th consecutive season in the top flight of Bosnian football, the Premier League of BiH. Besides competing in the Premier League, the team competed in the National Cup. The season covers the period from 25 June 2011 to 24 June 2012.

Players

Squad

(Captain)

(C)

Statistics

Kit

Friendlies

Želimir Vidović Cup

Competitions

Premier League

League table

Matches

Cup of Bosnia and Herzegovina

Round of 32

Round of 16

Quarter-finals

UEFA Europa League

Second qualifying round

Third qualifying round

References

FK Sarajevo seasons
Sarajevo